Cartersville is a city in Georgia, US.

Cartersville may also refer to:

Places in the United States
 Cartersville, Cumberland County, Virginia
 Cartersville, Pittsylvania County, Virginia
 Cartersville, Iowa
 Cartersville, South Carolina

See also
 Carterville (disambiguation)